Niphona malaccensis is a species of beetle in the family Cerambycidae. It was described by Stephan von Breuning in 1938. It is known from Borneo and Malaysia.

References

malaccensis
Beetles described in 1938